Chambers Township may refer to:

 Chambers Township, Ontario, Canada
 Chambers Township, Holt County, Nebraska, United States

Township name disambiguation pages